The 2018 Indonesia President's Cup Final was the final match of the 2018 Indonesia President's Cup, the 3rd season of Indonesia's pre-season premier club football tournament organised by PSSI. It was played at the Gelora Bung Karno Stadium in Jakarta on 17 February 2018 and contested between Persija Jakarta and Bali United.

Persija defeated Bali 3–0, winning the first title in their history.

Road to the final

Note: In all results below, the score of the finalist is given first (H: home; A: away).

Match

Details

References

2018 in Indonesian sport